Marcus Edred Pembrey FMedSci (born 20 April 1943) is a British clinical geneticist with a research interest in non-Mendelian inheritance in humans.  He is Emeritus Professor of Paediatric Genetics at UCL Great Ormond Street Institute of Child Health and Visiting Professor of Paediatric Genetics, University of Bristol. He featured in a 2005 'Horizon' program on BBC television called 'the Ghost in Your Genes'.

Early life and education 
Born into a medical family, Marcus Pembrey spent his childhood in Hurstpierpoint, Sussex, where his father was a General Practitioner. The rural setting and his aunts’ farm encouraged an interest in natural history. Educated at Hurstpierpoint College, he went to Guy's Hospital Medical School, London in 1960; with postgraduate research training at the Nuffield Unit of Medical Genetics, University of Liverpool 1969-71.

Career and research 
After further clinical training at Guy's Hospital, in 1979 he was appointed head of the new Mothercare Unit of Paediatric Genetics at the Institute of Child Health, London and Honorary consultant clinical geneticist at the Great Ormond Hospital for Children; posts he held until 1998. Made professor in 1986, he became Vice-Dean of the Institute of Child Health 1990 - 1998. He was instrumental in ensuring that the design of the Avon Longitudinal Study of Parents and Children ALSPAC included a genetic component.

Since 1979 his research has focused on ‘non-Mendelian inheritance’; first  on the inheritance of Fragile X Syndrome for which he proposed a ’premutation’ in 1985. and then Angelman Syndrome -  an early example of genomic imprinting in humans.  This latter research led in 1996 to a speculative paper on transgenerational modulation of gene expression. in which he refers to himself as a Neo-Lamarckian, a term he no longer uses.

Following  Swedish studies demonstrating  transgenerational effects of food supply, Pembrey collaborated with Lars Olov Bygren on research that featured in a 2005 'Horizon' program on BBC television called 'the Ghost in Your Genes'.,. The focus of his current research is environmental epigenomics and transgenerational responses, and he writes, speaks and broadcasts widely on this area for both expert and lay audiences. With Jean Golding he is closely involved in studies of intergenerational effects of environmental influences such as smoking and stress on child and adult development [8] within the Avon Longitudinal Study of Parents and Children ALSPAC, of which he was Director of Genetics until 2006.

Public engagement 
Appointed Advisor in Genetics to the Chief Medical Officer, UK Government's Department of Health 1989-1998. President, European Society of Human Genetics(ESHG)1994-1995; Chair, ESHG Committee on Ethical Issues (renamed Public and Professional Policy Committee) 1994-1998; Co-founder and ESHG Liaison Officer, International Federation of Human Genetics Societies 1996-2001. Co-founder of Progress Educational Trust in 1992 and chairman of Trustees almost continuously until 2014. The Trust's mission is to educate and debate the responsible application of reproductive and genetic science.

Honours
Honorary Doctor of Science (University of Bristol) July 2018.

Personal life 
He is married to Heather (née Burgess) with whom he has two children, Lucy and Adam, and five grandchildren.

See also
Edward J. Steele
Marion J. Lamb
Eva Jablonka
Neo-Lamarckism

References

External links
Epigenetic Inheritance and Evolution - Partial online text
Evolution in Four Dimensions - Partial online text
Hidden Inheritance- 'New Scientist' article by Gail Vines
Nature and Nurture by Marcus Pembrey (online text)

1943 births
Living people
People educated at Hurstpierpoint College
British evolutionary biologists
Fellows of the Academy of Medical Sciences (United Kingdom)